The Bages Tram-train is a railway project for the Catalan comarca of Bages. At the moment it is on the feasibility study phase, and it is expected to be ready by 2016, after two years of construction beginning in 2014. The cost of the project, excluding the rolling stock, will be of 105 million euro.

Features
This line will be 34.4 km long, 25 km of which are from Ferrocarrils de la Generalitat de Catalunya freight lines. With 25 stations, it will link the towns of Manresa, Sallent and Súria, as well as allow connection with other transportation services such as Rodalies Barcelona in Manresa.

See also
Autoritat Territorial de la Mobilitat de les Comarques Centrals

References

External links
Metrobarna

Railway lines in Catalonia
Proposed rail infrastructure in Spain
Transport in Bages